Cove Rock is a low offshore rock  west of North Foreland, King George Island, in the South Shetland Islands. It was charted by Discovery Investigations in 1937 and called descriptively Cone Rock; the spelling Cove Rock, likely through error in transcription, appeared in a Hydrographic Office publication in 1942, and became established.

References 

Rock formations of King George Island (South Shetland Islands)